= Wong Kung Tin =

Village on Lantau Island, Hong Kong

Coordinates: 22.2793°N 113.9888°E

Wong Kung Tin (Chinese: 黃公田) also known as Wong Fung Tin (黃蜂田) is a village on Lantau Island, Hong Kong.

== Administration ==
Wong Fung Tin is a recognized village under the New Territories Small House Policy.

== Features ==
As of 2014, there was no fresh water supply to Wong Kung Tin.
